The 26th World Mountain Running Championships were held in Kamnik, Slovenia on September 5, 2010. Around 350 athletes from 39 countries were present, which was a record of the number of nations taking part in the championships.

Results

Medals

Men

Women

References

External links
 WMRA website

World Mountain Running Championships
World Mountain Running